Androw Myllar (fl. 1503–1508) was the first Scottish printer.

Background
Myllar was a burgess of Edinburgh and a bookseller, but perhaps combined the sale of books with some other occupation. On 29 March 1503 the sum of 10 Scots pounds was paid by the Lord High Treasurer of Scotland "to Andro Millar for thir bukis undirwritten, viz., Decretum Magnum, Decretales Sextus cum Clementinis, Scotus super quatuor libris Sententiarum, Quartum Scoti, Opera Gersonis in tribus voluminibus." Another payment of fifty shillings was made on 22 December 1507 "for 3 prentit bukis to the King, tane fra Andro Millaris wyff."

The first book on which Myllar's name appears is an edition, printed in 1505, of Joannes de Garlandia's Multorum vocabulorum equiuocorum interpretation, of which the only copy known is in the Bibliothèque Nationale at Paris. It has a colophon which states that Androw Myllar, a Scotsman, had been solicitous that the work should be printed with admirable art and corrected with diligent care. The second book is the Expositio Sequentiarum, according to the use of Sarum, printed in 1506, the copy of which in the British Museum is believed to be unique. The last page contains Myllar's punning device, representing a windmill with the miller ascending the outside ladder and carrying a sack of grain upon his back. Beneath is the printer's monogram and name. These two books were undoubtedly printed abroad. M. Claudin, who discovered them, and Dr. Dickson have ascribed them to the press of Laurence Hostingue of Rouen; but Gordon Duff has produced evidence to show that they should rather be assigned to that of Pierre Violette, another printer at Rouen.

It was probably due to the influence of William Elphinstone the Bishop of Aberdeen, who was engaged in preparing an adaptation of the Sarum breviary for the use of his diocese, that James IV on 15 September 1507 granted a patent to Walter Chepman and Androw Myllar "to furnis and bring hame ane prent, with all stuff belangand tharto, and expert men to use the samyne, for imprenting within our Realme of the bukis of our Lawis, actis of parliament, croniclis, mess bukis, and portuus efter the use of our Realme, with addicions and legendis of Scottis sanctis, now gaderit to be ekit tharto, and al utheris bukis that salbe sene necessar, and to sel the sammyn for competent pricis."

Printing

Chepman having found the necessary capital, and Myllar having obtained the type from France, probably from Rouen, they set up their press in a house at the foot of Blackfriars Wynd, in the Southgait, now the Cowgate, of Edinburgh, and on 4 April 1508 issued the first book known to have been printed in Scotland, The Maying or Disport of Chaucer, better known as The Complaint of the Black Knight, and written not by Chaucer but by Lydgate. This tract consists of fourteen leaves, and has Chepman's device on the title-page, and Myllar's device at the end. The only copy known has been held in the Library of the Faculty of Advocates at Edinburgh since 1788.

Bound with this work are ten other unique pieces, eight of which are also from the Southgait press, but two only of all are perfect, The Maying or Disport of Chaucer and The Goldyn Targe of William Dunbar. Four of the tracts bear the devices both of Chepman and of Myllar, and three others that of Myllar alone.

The titles of the other pieces, two only of which are dated, are as follows:
 The Knightly Tale of Golagros and Gawane, 8 April 1508 
 The Porteous of Nobleness, a translation of "Le Bréviaire des nobles" by Alain Chartier, 20 April 1508
 Syr Eglamoure of Artoys
 The Goldyn Targe, by William Dunbar
 Ane Buke of Gude Counsale to the King
 The Flyting of Dunbar and Kennedy
 The Tale of Orpheus and Erudices his Quene, by Robert Henryson
 The Ballade of Lord Barnard Stewart, by William Dunbar

Two other pieces, The Tretis of the Twa Mariit Wemen and the Wedo, also by Dunbar, and A Gest of Robyn Hode, are contained in the same volume, but they are printed with different types, and there is no evidence to prove that they emanated from the first Scottish press. About two years later, in 1510, the Aberdeen Breviary, the main cause of the introduction of printing into Scotland, was executed by the command and at the expense of Walter Chepman; but doubt exists as to the actual printer of this, the last but most important work of the primitive Scottish press. Neither in connection with the Breviary nor elsewhere does Androw Myllar's name again occur.

References

Further reading
 Dickson and Edmond's Annals of Scottish Printing, 1890
 Gordon Duff's Early Printed Books, 1893
 The Knightly Tale of Golagros and Gawane and other Ancient Poems, edited by David Laing, 1827
 Breuiarium Aberdonense, with preface by David Laing (Bannatyne Club), 1854

15th-century births
16th-century births
Year of birth missing
16th-century printers
16th-century Scottish businesspeople
Businesspeople from Edinburgh
Scottish printers
Scottish booksellers
Burgesses in Scotland
Place of birth missing
Year of death missing
Scottish expatriates in France